German Brazilians (German: Deutschbrasilianer, Hunsrik: Deitschbrasiliooner) refers to Brazilians of full or partial German ancestry. German Brazilians live mostly in the country's South Region, with a smaller but still significant percentage living in Southeast Region.

Between 1824 and 1972, about 260,000 Germans settled in Brazil, the fifth largest nationality to immigrate after the Portuguese, the Italians, the Spanish, and the Japanese. By 1940, the German diaspora in Brazil totaled about a million. The rapid increase in numbers was due to a relatively high birth rate, the highest in Brazil amongst immigrant groups although still lower than that of the local population. The majority settled in the Brazilian states of Rio Grande do Sul, Santa Catarina, Paraná, São Paulo and Rio de Janeiro. Less than 5% of Germans settled in Minas Gerais, Pernambuco, and Espírito Santo.

According to a 1999 survey by IBGE researcher Simon Schwartzman, in a representative sample of the Brazilian population 3.6% said they had some degree of German ancestry, a percentage that in a population of about 200 million amount to 7.2 million descendants. In 2004, Deutsche Welle cited the number of 5 million Brazilians of German descent. According to a 2016 survey published by Institute of Applied Economic Research, in a universe of 46,801,772 names of Brazilians analyzed, 1,525,890 or 3.3% of them had the only or the last surname of German origin, a proportion that represents about 6.7 million individuals if applied to the entire population in that year.

German dialects together make up the second most spoken first language in Brazil after Portuguese. A few Brazilian municipalities have Brazilian Hunsrückisch and Germanic East Pomeranian as co-official with Portuguese, they are located in Southern Brazil and Espírito Santo. It's estimated that between 2 to 3 million people can speak Brazilian Hunsrückisch.

Overview

The 19th century was marked by an intense emigration of Europeans to different parts of the world, which led to a process of Europeanisation of these areas. Between 1816 and 1850, 5 million people left Europe; between 1850 and 1880 another 22 million people emigrated. Between 1846 and 1932, 60 million Europeans emigrated. Many Germans left the German states after the failed revolutions of 1848. Between 1878 and 1892, another 7 million Germans left Germany; after the 1870s Germany was one of the countries from which the largest numbers of people emigrated, the vast majority to the United States. From 1820 to 1840, Germans represented 21.4% of all European immigrants entering the USA; 32.2% in the following two decades; and at the end of the 19th century they were the largest immigrant group (21.9%) in the US.
German immigration to Brazil was small compared to the numbers who went to the United States, and also compared to immigration of other nationalities, such as Portuguese, Italians and Spaniards, who together made up over 80% of the immigrants to Brazil during the period of greatest immigration by Europeans. Germans appeared in fourth place among immigrants to Brazil, but dropped to fifth place when Japanese immigration increased after 1908.

Even though the immigration of Germans to Brazil was small, it had a notable impact on the ethnic composition of the country, particularly of the Southern Brazilian population. Different factors led to this large influence. First of all, German immigration to Brazil is an old phenomenon which started as early as 1824, many decades before the beginning of the immigration of other European ethnic groups to Brazil. For example, the first significant groups of Italians to immigrate to Brazil only arrived in 1875, many decades after the arrival of the first Germans. When the settlement of other Europeans in Brazil began, the Germans had already been living there for many generations. Another factor was the high birth rates among German Brazilians. Research has found that between 1826 and 1828 a first-generation German Brazilian woman had an average of 8.5 children, and the second generation had an average of 10.4 children per woman.

The book The Monroe Doctrine by T B Edgington said:

"The natural increase of the German population in southern Brazil is marvelous. As a rule they rear from ten to fifteen children in each family. Blumenau, a colony which was settled by the Germans over fifty years ago, more than doubles itself every ten years. Southern Brazil is now called 'Greater Germany', and the Germans exercise there a commercial and financial supremacy."

Even though the population of German descent makes up a small minority in Brazil, they represent a very large percentage of the population of the South. Jean Roche estimated that people of German descent made up 13.3% of the population in Rio Grande do Sul in 1890, and that they had increased to 21.6% of the population in 1950. By 1920, the vast majority of the population of German descent was Brazilian-born. The Census of 1920 revealed that foreigners constituted only 3% of the population of the old German communities of São Leopoldo, Estrela, Montenegro and Bom Retiro do Sul. São Leopoldo, then with 46,482 inhabitants, had only 1,159 foreigners. In the new German communities the proportion of foreigners was larger, for example in Ijuí (15%) and Erechim (25%), indicating they were newer destinations of immigrants in the state. The Census of 1940 revealed that virtually all the population of German descent was native-born.

Immigration
When German-speaking immigrants first arrived in Brazil starting at the beginning of the 19th century, they did not identify themselves so much as a unified German-Brazilian group. However, as time went on this common regional identity did emerge for many different geo-socio-political reasons. Germans immigrated mainly from what is now Germany, but also from other countries where German communities were established. From 1824 to 1969, around 250,000 Germans emigrated to Brazil, being the fourth largest immigrant community to settle in the country, after the Portuguese, Italians and Spaniards. About 30% of them arrived between World War I and World War II.

First German settlement in Brazil

The first German immigrants to settle in Brazil were 165 families who settled in Ilhéus, Bahia, in 1818. One year later, 200 families settled São Jorge, in the same state. Some Germans were brought to work in the Brazilian army after Independence from Portugal in 1822.

However, the cradle of the German settlement in Brazil was São Leopoldo, in 1824. At that time Southern Brazil had a very low population density. Most of its inhabitants were concentrated on the coast and a few in the Pampas. The interior was covered by forests and sparsely populated by different groups of native Amerindians. The absence of a unified population in the interior was regarded as a problem by the Brazilian government because Southern Brazil could easily be invaded by neighboring countries.

Since Brazil was recently independent from Portugal, it was not possible to bring Portuguese immigrants. Germany was suffering the effects of the wars against Napoleon, overpopulation and poverty in the countryside. Many Germans were willing to immigrate to Brazil. Furthermore, Brazil's Empress, Maria Leopoldina, was Austrian and encouraged the arrival of German immigrants.

First communities
Major Schaeffer, a German who was living in Brazil, was sent to Germany in order to bring immigrants. He brought immigrants and soldiers from Rhineland-Palatinate. To attract the immigrants, the Brazilian government had promised large tracts of land where they could settle with their families and colonize the region. In fact, these lands were in the middle of big forests and the first Germans had been abandoned by the Brazilian government. From 1824 to 1829, the Major brought 5,000 Germans to Brazil.

German immigrants in Brazil settled mostly in rural areas, called colonies (colônias in Portuguese). These colonies were created by the Brazilian government, and the lands were distributed among the immigrants. They had to construct their own houses and cultivate the land.

The first years were not easy. Many Germans died of tropical disease, while others left the colonies to find better living conditions. The German colony of São Leopoldo was in the early years a disaster. Nevertheless, in the following years, a further 4,830 Germans arrived at São Leopoldo, and then the colony started to develop, with the immigrants establishing the town of Novo Hamburgo (New Hamburg). From São Leopoldo and Novo Hamburgo, the German immigrants spread into other areas of Rio Grande do Sul, mainly close to sources of rivers. The whole region of Vale dos Sinos was populated by Germans. During the 1830s and part of the 1840s German immigration to Brazil was interrupted due to conflicts in the country (Ragamuffin War).

Waves of immigrants
Immigration restarted after 1845 with the creation of new colonies. The most important ones were Blumenau in 1850 and Joinville in 1851, both in Santa Catarina state; these attracted thousands of German immigrants to the region. Some of the mass influx was due to the Revolutions of 1848 in the German states. Nowadays these areas of German colonization are among the wealthiest parts of Brazil, with the lowest levels of unemployment and illiteracy found in the country, and still retain a strong influence from German culture.

By the end of the 19th century, 122 German communities had been created in Rio Grande do Sul, and many others in Santa Catarina, Paraná, São Paulo, Minas Gerais and Rio de Janeiro. Germans helped to establish a middle-class population in Brazil, a country that was formerly divided between slaves and their masters.

"Nowhere are our colonies, those loyal offshoots from the mother root, so promising as here. Today in these provinces, over thirty per cent of the inhabitants are Germans, or of German descent, and the ratio of their natural increase far exceeds that of the Portuguese. Surely to us belongs this part of the world, and the key to it all is Santa Catharina, stretching from the harbor of San Francisco far into the interior with its hitherto undeveloped, hardly suspected wealth. Here indeed, in southern Brazil, is a rich and healthy land, where the German emigrant may retain his nationality, where for all that is comprised in the word 'Germanismus,' a glorious future smiles."
– Dr. Leyser, a German traveller in South Brazil at the beginning of the 20th centuryBy 1905 the German Navy Office listed that there were over 140k germans living in Brazil, 131.5k of those being Reich Nationals and the other 8.5k being Reich Citizens, with 24 german consulates.

Urban Germans in Brazil

Not all Germans who settled in Brazil became farmers. In the early 20th century, very few rural areas of Southern Brazil were empty. Most of them had been settled by German, Italian and Polish immigrants during the 19th century. Given this situation, most Germans who immigrated to Brazil during the 20th century settled in big towns, although many of them also settled in the old rural German colonies. German immigration to Brazil peaked during the 1920s, after World War I. These Germans were mostly middle-class laborers from urban areas of Germany, different from the poor peasants who had settled in the colonies of Brazil during the 19th century.

In 1858, Germans were 15% of Porto Alegre's population,  10% of São Paulo's population in 1860, and 60% of the immigrants living in Curitiba by the end of the 19th century.  In Rio de Janeiro, by 1830 there were 20 businesses owned by Germans. Twenty years later the number reached 50.

People of German descent actively participated in the industrialization and development of big cities in Brazil, such as Curitiba and Porto Alegre.

In São Paulo, Germans founded their first colony in 1829. By the beginning of the 20th century, the city was considered the center of the German Brazilian Culture. The city attracted German immigrants until the 1950s. Today, there are 400,000 German Brazilians living within Greater São Paulo.

Pioneering period

The German settlements, and also those of other European ethnic groups, occupy a vast area in the centers of the states of Paraná, Santa Catarina and Rio Grande do Sul. To the east, they border the old areas of Azorean Portuguese colonization, and to the south and west, the gaúcho grazing areas. The areas of German settlement emerged in the center of the region, isolated from other settlements. In these remote pastoral and farming areas, the immigrants were not under the control of the powerful Brazilian landowners. Due to this isolation, the immigrants were able to organize themselves independently, building their own churches, schools and municipal authorities. The children were educated in German. Portuguese became dominant later, as a means of communication with Brazilians or with immigrants of other nationalities.

The first generation of immigrants faced the arduous task of surviving while opening gaps in the virgin forest to build their own houses and roads. Attacks by Indians were common. Isolated from other settlements, the Germans also had to face the difficulty of finding markets for their products. The initial difficulty was to define which productive activities could be integrated into the Brazilian economy. Only the penury faced by these people in Europe, due to the consequences of the Industrial Revolution and of the crisis during the consolidation of European nations, can explain their persistence in Brazil, sometimes facing miserable conditions which were worse than those they left in Europe. Once in Brazil, however, they became small landowners, which facilitated their development.

Period of prosperity

The following generations benefited from the efforts of the pioneer immigrants and prospered. The families grew and the settlements expanded, coming to constitute a thriving German community of small landowners. At first, they found virgin forests that could be occupied or bought at low prices. During this period, the more isolated communities suffered from messianic anomie, influenced by popular German traditions of Protestant aspirations. This led to the Revolt of the Muckers in the 1870s, which culminated in several crimes and murders.

Identity

According to Darcy Ribeiro, despite their isolation, the descendants of Germans knew that Brazil was their home now. The new immigrants who arrived from Germany were clearly different from German Brazilians of older stock. German Brazilians had moved away from European standards, habits, language and aspirations. However, coexistence with the local Brazilians (Amerindians, Portuguese Brazilians of Azorean stock, mixed-race gaúchos and a few Afro-Brazilians) showed that the differences with the locals were also great. The misery faced by Brazilians of other origins was also not attractive to German Brazilians. Hence, German Brazilians eventually created a third identity, which was not completely German (because of the distance that created sharp differences) but also not completely Brazilian (because of the undesirable misery seen in Brazilians). Their isolation and cultural and linguistic conservatism gave rise to conflicts between German Brazilians (and also Japanese Brazilians, Italian Brazilians, etc.) on one side, and Brazilians of older extraction on the other. The nationalization was fundamental, compelling the teaching of foreign languages at schools, breaking the isolation of the communities and recruiting young people of foreign origins to serve in the military.

Migrating to urban centers, the younger generations broadened their cultural horizon and their own vision of Brazil. When they returned to their hometowns, they endorsed a Brazilian identity which was already becoming imperative. The above-average social, economic and cultural progress of the German settlements and their simultaneous integration into Brazilian markets as producers and consumers facilitated the integration of the descendants of Germans in Brazil. Today, this population is no longer seen as "foreign" by other Brazilians, but as a modern progressive urban population. The identification as "Brazilians" is also dominant among German Brazilians, since the cultural world of their ancestors was completely changed; it has become unrealistic for them to assert any other ethnic identity than Brazilian. Today, the only notable differences between Brazilians of German and of non-German European and Arab ancestry are in levels of education (higher among German Brazilians), in a few surviving German traditions.

Panorama of German communities

The German Brazilian areas form, today, a Brazilian region with its own character, made up of towns and large concentrations of residents around the church, commerce and school. These rural villages are connected to major cities where the economy was diversified, adding cottage industries to the original agricultural production. In this way, the Southern Brazilian areas of European settlements formed a prosperous regional economy and a European cultural landscape, contrasting with the relative Portuguese-Brazilian uniformity found in the rest of Brazil. In recent years a large industrial development has occurred in these areas, stemming from the cottage industry. Some of the old German communities are now prosperous industrial centers, such as São Leopoldo, Novo Hamburgo, Blumenau, Joinville and Itajaí. The Germans became entrepreneurs due to their knowledge of more complex techniques of production than those dominated by other Brazilians. In addition their bilingualism gave them better European contacts.

Historically, a considerable number of German Brazilians and others of European ancestry populated certain cities and states. In the city of Blumenau, Santa Catarina, during the last decade of the 19th century, 70% of the population was ethnically Germanic, 15% were Italians, and 15% others. The German Brazilian population in Espírito Santo was 73,000 in 1960, 145,000 in 1980 and 250,000 in 2004.

End of expansion

If in the beginning Germans found a region with vast empty areas, later with the compulsory occupation of the lands, the German expansion came to an end. As they expanded, the German settlements encountered the pastoral areas of the gaúchos to the west and south. The Gaúcho area was an impoverished region consisting of huge farms, dominated by a small elite of landowners who monopolized the lands and a mass of underemployed people who worked for them in poor conditions, similar to the rest of Brazil and very different from the areas of German settlements, where each family had their own small farm. Due to the expansion of German and other European settlements in Southern Brazil, the lands for each family became limited because there was no more land available. Plots of land previously settled by a single family started to be occupied by two or four families. Without their own land, some descendants of Germans regressed to a situation of poverty, mingling with the mass of gaúchos and descendants of Azorean Portuguese who make up the poor in Southern Brazil, in search of land to work.

Culture

Language
The use of the German language is in decline in Brazil, however, there are 3,000,000 Brazilians who speak German and important German-speaking communities in Brazil even almost 200 years after the beginning of immigration. According to Born and Dickgiesser (1989, p. 55) the number of Brazilians of German descent in 1986 was 3.6 million. For Rio Grande do Sul, based on data from Birsa (Bilingualism in Rio Grande do Sul), for 1970, Altenhofen (1996, p. 56) estimated at 1,386,945 the number of speakers of a variety of German. As of 1996, he estimated that it had dropped to between 700,000 and 900,000 speakers. Damke (1997, p. 59), as of 1996, estimated more than 2 million speakers of any variety of the German language in Brazil.

German immigrants preserved their language more than any other group of immigrants in Brazil. This was mainly due to shared cultural identity and the desire to recreate in Brazil an environment with characteristics of the country they believed they would never return to. In addition, the large differences between the German and Portuguese languages hindered learning of the national language of Brazil, which was and remains a pretext for continuing use of German dialects. The main German dialect spoken in Brazil is Hunsrückisch, and according to Ammon, who visited German-speaking communities in Southern Brazil in 2004, the Hunsrik Language lexicon is still quite similar to that of modern German speakers, even after almost 200 years of distance.

Hamel (1988, p. 64) and Damke (1997, p. 60–61) observed that there is a balance between the use of German and Portuguese in the German-speaking communities of Brazil. But, gradually, the trend is that Portuguese is becoming dominant. Despite the "myth of monolingualism in the country", i.e., that all Brazilians speak only Portuguese, German continues to have a strong presence even today. This myth is effective in hiding the country's linguistic minorities, including the indigenous nations and as well as the speakers of immigrant languages. But it also hides the majority of the Brazilian population that speaks discredited varieties of Portuguese instead of the formal standard Portuguese taught in schools. According to Oliveira (2000: 84), Brazil is one of the most multilingual countries in the world, with inhabitants speaking around 200 languages, of which about 170 are indigenous and 30 languages of immigrants.

The Brazilian Census of 1940 revealed that German was the second most spoken language in Brazil, with 644,458 speakers. In a total population of nearly 1 million German Brazilians at that time, over half still spoke German as their mother tongue. The vast majority of the German speakers were Brazilian-born, with a minority born in Germany or in another German-speaking country. The other main languages spoken were Italian with 458,054, Japanese with 192,698 and Spanish with 74,381.

Discrimination
The "myth of monolingualism", along with the general idea that speaking Portuguese was a "condition to be Brazilian", has masked the presence of minority languages and contributed to ideas that German Brazilians were separatist and did not want to learn Portuguese or assimilate. However, these beliefs did not take into account that the German communities in Brazil were formed in places isolated by forests, where the Portuguese-speaking population was not present, and it was natural that the children continue speaking German rather than adopt the Portuguese language with which they rarely had contact. The fact that they spoke German did not prevent them from seeing themselves as Brazilians, since they saw themselves as "Brazilians of German culture". Under Getúlio Vargas's government, during World War II, when Brazil broke off diplomatic relations with Germany (and also with the other Axis Powers, Italy and Japan), the use of the German language was repressed: teaching German in schools and publication of German newspapers were forbidden (together with Italian and Japanese).

In this context, monolingualism appeared to solve the problems of learning Portuguese, and the language of immigrants was regarded as responsible for school failure and difficulties in learning Portuguese. In 1989 there was a controversy regarding German speakers in Brazil when the mayor of Santa Maria do Herval, a town in Rio Grande do Sul, issued a verbal orientation to the municipality's elementary teachers to retain students using Hunsrückisch during break time to "teach them Portuguese". Disagreement ensued, with some decrying the initiative as repressive, and others (including people of German descent) supporting the mayor on the basis that not being able to speak Portuguese is a handicap in Brazilian society. The guideline has since been overturned.

Religion
Most German Brazilians are either Roman Catholics or Lutherans. As with other Brazilians, there is a significant minority of non-religious people, and Pentecostalism is on the rise. Almost 85% of all Lutherans in Latin America and the Caribbean live in Brazil. Brazil has the second largest Lutheran community in the Americas, after the United States and ahead of Canada.

Media
The printed media include newspapers like "Deutsche Zeitung" or magazines like "Entre Rios", "Lindenpost" and "Sankt Paulusblatt".

Fashion and models
Within the fashion business, influences of German ancestry have been noticeable throughout Brazil.

Renowned German Brazilian models include Gisele Bündchen, Ana Hickmann, Ana Claudia Michels, Mariana Weickert, Letícia Birkheuer, Raquel Zimmermann, Cintia Dicker, Solange Wilvert, Monique Olsen, Carol Trentini, Jeísa Chiminazzo, Shirley Mallmann, Camila Finn, Bruna Erhardt and Aline Weber.

Winners of the Miss Brazil beauty pageant have included Vera Fischer (1969), Mariza Sommer (1974), Ingrid Budag (1975), Eveline Schroeter (1980), Maria Carolina Portella Otto (1990), Leila Cristine Schuster (1993), Thaisa Thomsen (2002), Carina Beduschi (2005), Rafaela Zanella (2006), Gabriela Markus (2012), and Marthina Brandt (2015), who all share German ancestry.

Year of Germany
Beginning May 2013 Brazil celebrates the "Year of Germany in Brazil". Just in time for German Unity Day on 3 October 2012 the world-famous Christ the Redeemer monument in Rio de Janeiro was illuminated in Germany's national colors of black, red and gold to point towards this awaited event. The motto of the year is "Germany and Brazil – when ideas come together". The Unidos da Tijuca school, the third-oldest samba school, reigning carnival champions, chose to go for a German theme at this year's Carnival with an unusual title for their 80-minute performance in February 2013: "Alemanha Encantada" or "Enchanted Germany," which is about "Brazil and Germany coming together: colours, cultures, and capabilities," the Tagesspiegel newspaper reported. It was a mammoth show, involving eight floats, built on buses, with various Germanic features – including outsized Playmobil figures, the moon (to represent Germany pioneering rocket scientists, e.g. Wernher von Braun), and figures from ancient Germanic mythology, including thunder god Thor. Artistic director Paulo Barros, who has already choreographed two winning Sambadrome performances, packed Germany into five acts, beginning with Germanic gods and assorted mythic creatures. There follows Goethe's Faust, Bertolt Brecht's outcast characters, Fritz Lang robots, and a depiction of Marlene Dietrich as The Blue Angel. Meanwhile, the "Universe of Children" section is dedicated to German fairytales and toys. The whole spectacle was broadcast in its entirety on Brazilian TV station Globo-TV, with an audience of more than 190 million viewers.

Forced assimilation

We most desire that at any cost a German country containing some 20 to 30 million Germans may grow in the twentieth century in Brazil, and that, no matter whether it remains a portion of Brazil or becomes a self-containing state or enters into close relations with our empire.

Gustav von Schmoller, German economist (1900).

When Germans first arrived in Southern Brazil in 1824, they found a country with a climate, vegetation and culture very different from those of Germany. Southern Brazil was a land of gauchos, cattle herders who lived, and still live, in the Pampas region of the Southern Cone. In the following decades, however, waves of German-speaking immigrants arrived, to the point that in many areas of Southern Brazil the vast majority of the inhabitants were Germans and even after three or four generations born in Brazil, these people used to consider themselves Germans.

Between 1937 and 1945 a significant portion of the Brazilian population suffered interference in daily life produced by a "campaign of nationalization". This population – called "alien" by the Brazilian government – was composed of immigrants and their descendants. Both the Brazilian Empire and the early Republic allowed groups of immigrants to settle in isolated communities, mainly in Southern Brazil, and to some extent in other parts, such as Espírito Santo, in the Southeast. These people had not been assimilated into the majority Brazilian society, a fact that worried the government of President Getúlio Vargas. The army had an important role during this process of forced assimilation of these areas of "foreign colonization" that created so-called "ethnic cysts" in Brazil. German Brazilians saw themselves as part of a pluralist society, so that the Deutschtum conception (of being part of a community with a shared German ancestry) seemed compatible with the fact that they were also Brazilian citizens. However, the Brazilian government only accepted the idea of the jus soli, so that all people born in Brazil should see themselves as Brazilians, and leave other ethnic associations behind. The Brazilian view contrasted with the jus sanguinis conception of most German Brazilians of that time, who were still connected to the ancestral homeland.

Not only the people of German origin were considered "alien": almost all descendants of immigrants, in some degree, were "non-assimilated", in the opinion of Bethlem and other participants in the campaign. However, evidence of greater resistance to abrasileiramento (Brazilianization) was found in those areas considered "redoubts of Germanism", a situation considered risky to the cultural, racial and territorial integrity of the nation. One of the areas considered "non-patriotic" was the Vale do Itajaí, where the population was composed mostly of Germans, Italians and Poles. In the 1930s, the Vale do Itajaí was described  as a place of "strange costumes,  full of non-national Brazilians, contaminated by ideals of a nation that collapsed Brazil, a place of disintegration of national spirit". During this period of nationalization, the Germans were considered the most "alien", the Italians closest to the Brazilians, and the Poles in an intermediary position, but none of them were seen as unequivocally Brazilian. The fear of secession was not a novelty in regard to the definition of the Brazilian nation-state: long before 1939, Brazilian nationalists feared the collapse of the South, considering it "too Germanized". Many members of the Brazilian army participated during this process, such as Nogueira:

Nogueira also compared the German Brazilians to "an octopus extending its tentacles"  in Southern Brazil. Nogueira used the image of the occupation of the most fertile areas of southern territory by foreigners, who had no intention of being integrated into the country, but had remained segregated since the beginning of their settlement. The record of the first impressions about the city of Blumenau in his book received the subtitle of "One Weird City", arguing that "the German language is spoken without constraints, including in public offices". Silvio Romero (1906) compared German immigration to the Barbarian Invasions which brought about the end of the Roman Empire. Writings by different authors against the German settlement in Brazil displayed clear xenophobia against the so-called "German threat". The Portuguese language was presented as a fundamental criterion of nationality and this justified the nationalization of education and the closing of ethnic schools. Most German Brazilians could barely speak Portuguese, and when German was prohibited in the country, they faced many difficulties due to this language barrier.

From this perspective, the human element representative of the "more legitimate" national formation had the task of conforming immigrants and their descendants to the myth of the amalgam of the three races that makes up the Brazilian nation (Europeans, Black Africans and Amerindians).

In the 1930s, Brazil was home to one of the largest German populations outside Germany, with 100,000 German-born people and a community of 1 million people of German descent, whose ancestors had been settling the country since 1824. Brazil also had the largest number of members of the Nazi Party outside of Germany, with 2,822 members. The large number of people with German roots and a notable number of Nazi members were used by the Brazilian government to justify their programs of nationalization. During World War II, in 1942, Nazi Germany attacked Brazilian ships and Brazil declared war against Germany. President Getúlio Vargas initiated a strict program of forced cultural assimilation – Nacionalismo- that worked quite efficiently, if not initially.
He forbade any organised manifestation of German culture in Brazil. Schools were required to teach exclusively in Portuguese, and the publishing of books, newspapers and magazines in foreign languages (which in practice meant German language and Italian language) was subjected to prior censorship by the Ministry of Justice The use of foreign languages in governmental precincts was forbidden, as well as the use of foreign languages in religious services. Members of the Brazilian army were sent to areas of "foreign colonization" to "monitor" the local population. There are records of arrest or moral coercion motivated by the use of foreign languages.

Nazism

These problems were aggravated with the rise of Nazism in Germany. The Nazi Party soon took to the task of organizing abroad, wherever significant populations of German origin were present. In Brazil, the results were not as the party expected. About 3,000 people joined it, making the Brazilian section the numerically most important foreign branch of the Nazi Party; however, the considerable population of German origin in Brazil may have been more a problem than an asset for the German Nazi Party: if on the one hand it raised the hope of interfering in Brazilian internal politics, on the other hand there was a concern not to alienate the Brazilian government, which Germany at the time hoped could be brought to its side , or at least remain in a benevolent neutrality.

In addition there was the issue of the local Brazilian traditionalist syncretic party, the Brazilian Integralist Action. In contrast to the Nazi Party, the Integralists favoured miscegenation, and had the rural sertanejo as a noble ideal of representation of the people, which they thought was essential to Brazilian national identity; this directly conflicted with the Nazi ideology of racial purity. This was a problem, since the Integralists were able to attract some membership among Brazilians of German ancestry, thus competing with the Nazi organisation; moreover, until 1937, when Vargas imposed a dictatorship, the Integralists, unlike the Nazi Party, were able to participate in elections, and so there was a natural tendency of informal Nazi support for the Integralists.

Support for the Nazi regime in Germany was widespread among Brazilians of German descent, which certainly worried the Brazilian authorities. The racial and nationalist views of the Nazis easily blended into the Deutschtum ideology. However, the Nazis weren't able to capitalise this into a really strong membership, and their local actions, such as proposed boycotts, were resisted by most of the population of German ancestry.

In fact, the fears of the Brazilian authorities regarding the expansion of Nazism in Brazil seem exaggerated in retrospect; however, it should be taken into consideration that in 1938 Germany annexed Austria, and in 1939 it dismembered, then also annexed Czechoslovakia, and that the local sections of the Nazi Party were fully involved in these actions; manipulation of German minorities also played an important role in the internal politics of Poland (Danzig) and Lithuania (Memel). So, while exaggerated, the Brazilian government's worries seem to a certain extent justifiable.

From Rolf Hoffmann's archive, roll 29, frames 26.600–656, mentioned by Alton Frye in "Nazi Germany and the American Hemisphere, 1933–1941", p. 101–102, the Brazilian diplomat Sérgio Corrêa da Costa, in the book 'The history of a secret war' ('Crônica de uma guerra secreta' in Portuguese), reveals that Hitler had planned to colonize Brazil (which several historians from the English speaking world had already shown, as well as the testimony of Rauschning, who was present when Hitler spoke of plans of colonizing Brazil).

The plan was not new. In his "Gross Deutschland, die Arbeit des 20. Jahrhunderts", published in Leipzig, 1911, Tannenberg outlines the principle of partition of Central and South American between the great powers, to Germany belonging the subtropical part facing the Atlantic Ocean:

In April 1938, Vargas outlawed the Nazi Party in Brazil (the Brazilian parties themselves were outlawed in December 1937).  However, in December 1937 the Nazi German Ambassador to Rio de Janeiro, Karl Ritter, was already reporting nationalising actions by the Brazilian government. At that moment, conditions were being imposed for the continued functioning of German schools. Ritter had a problem in that his powers as Ambassador did not enable him to interfere on behalf of Brazilian citizens of German origin. However, in February 1938 Ritter met Vargas, and demanded criticism of Germany and Nazism in the Brazilian press be gagged. As confirmed by diplomatic documents later declassified, the interest of the embassy was in the Reichsdeutschen, or German citizens, not the Deutschbrasilianer, or Brazilian citizens of German ancestry.

In April, Vargas forbade any political activity by foreigners; in May, the Integralists attempted a coup against Vargas, which further complicated relations between Brazil and Germany. Up to this moment, however, no actions were taken against cultural, religious or sports associations. Measures were intensified in 1939, when the public use of foreign languages was forbidden, including in elementary schools and religious ceremonies (harsh as this is, it is necessary to remember, as René Gertz points out, that about half of Lutheran ministers in Rio Grande do Sul were affiliated with the Nazi Party) . The cultural associations had to stop promoting foreign cultures. In 1942, when Brazil entered World War II, further restrictions were put in place, and their enforcement was made stricter. No effort was made to suppress the Lutheran church; the teaching of foreign languages, including German, in high schools and colleges continued, as well as their private use. Publicly speaking foreign languages, including German, was banned under penalty of imprisonment; this was especially enforced against the public use of German. Stores owned by Germans were ransacked. Establishments registered in foreign names had to be changed and worship in churches had to be only in Portuguese. During World War II, the Brazilian Expeditionary Force (FEB) enlisted many Germans and people of German descent to fight alongside the Allied forces, which was difficult for many of them, considering that the soldiers were forced to fight against Germany.

There were differences in emphasis during the nationalization campaign; in particular, the interventor (unelected governor) of Rio Grande do Sul, Cordeiro de Farias, was notable for his harshness. At the time of Brazil's declaration of war against Germany, popular riots against citizens of German origin erupted in Rio Grande do Sul, as a response to the sinking of Brazilian merchant ships by German U-boats that resulted in more than 600 deaths. When the Army repressed those riots and ensured the physical integrity of the citizens, Cordeiro de Farias offered his resignation, which was rejected, but he was soon sent to Italy as a military commander and replaced by Colonel Ernesto Dornelles, a much more moderate leader.

Postwar developments

Since then, the Southern Brazilian German regional culture has been in decline. Some have decried this as a tragic loss for the country while others feel that this means national progress, arguing that assimilation ultimately leads to togetherness. However, German influence can still be seen all across the southern states, be it in architecture, shops, town names or the way of life. Many German schools re-opened during the 1950s and are regarded as some of the best places to educate children.

Education

The Colégio Visconde de Porto Seguro, founded in 1872 as Deutsche Schule by the Germans immigrants in São Paulo, is the largest German School worldwide. In Rio de Janeiro, Germans founded their first school in 1862 (today Colégio Cruzeiro).

Aside from Colégio Visconde, Brazil has the following German international schools:
 Colégio Humboldt São Paulo
 Deutsche Schule Rio de Janeiro

Historic German schools:
 Escola Hygienopolis – Waldorf-Schule – in São Paulo
 Instituto Preteologico in Sao Leopoldo
 Rede Sinodal – a network of Lutheran schools dating back to 1924, organized by Lutheran Brazilians, mainly German Brazilians. Classes were taught in German in the early years.
The city of Blumenau has, since 2019, adopted a policy aiming to turn all of its public elementary schools in bilingual schools, where all the subjects are taught simultaneously in Portuguese and in a second language. By 2022, the city has adopted this policy in 18 schools, of which 4 now teach German as a second language (the other 14 teach either English or Brazilian Sign Language).

Health
Germans also founded hospital such as the Hospital Moinho de Ventos  in Porto Alegre, Hospital do Amparo and Hospital Alemão (today Hospital Central da Aeronáutica) in Rio de Janeiro and Hospital Alemão Oswaldo Cruz, Hospital Samaritano, Hospital Santa Catarina and Hospital Santa Helena in São Paulo.

Food and beverage

Germans introduced new types of food and beverage in Brazil or reinforced their utilizations by Brazilians. The wheat culture in Brazil arrived by German immigrants.

Kuchen, Sauerkraut (known in Portuguese as chucrute, is also used as derogatory term to designate Germans, and people of Central European origin or descent in general), Eisbein, new types of sausage and vegetables are some examples of food introduced in Brazil by the immigrants. In Curitiba, sausage are commonly known as vina, from the German Wiener (Wiener Würstchen). In Southern Brazil, Fruit preserves are known as chimia, from the German Schmier.

Chopp or Chope  (from German Schoppen) in Brazilian Portuguese is the word for draught beer or just beer. Today, beer is the most consumed beverage in Brazil.
The tradition of brewing in Brazil dates back to German immigration in the early 19th century. The first breweries date from the 1830s, although the brand Bohemia is claimed to be the first Brazilian beer, with production starting in 1853 in the city of Petrópolis founded by the German-Brazilian Henrique Kremer. In 1913 there were 134 breweries in Rio Grande do Sul. Brahma was founded in 1888 in Rio de Janeiro by the Swiss immigrant Joseph Villiger. Antarctica (Companhia Antarctica Paulista) was founded in the same year by the Brazilian Joaquim Salles and the German immigrant Louis Bücher in São Paulo. In 1999 the two brands merged creating AmBev.

Sport

The German community founded two of the main football clubs in Brazil. The first one Grêmio Foot-Ball Porto Alegrense was founded in 1903 by the German and English community in Porto Alegre. Today, the club is the most popular football club in Southern Brazil. In 1909, Coritiba Foot Ball Club was founded by the German population in Curitiba. The club nickname is White-Thigh due to the presence of German Brazilians among its first players.

Other clubs were founded in other cities as Sociedade Germania in Rio de Janeiro founded in 1821. In São Paulo, Esporte Clube Pinheiros was founded on 7 September 1899 by German immigrants as Sport Club Germânia. Germânia is the fourth oldest football club of Brazil and was part of the very first interclub match of the country. During the course of World War II the club abandoned references to its German origin and in 1941 was renamed to Pinheiros. São Paulo FC also have connections with the German community after merging, during the World War II, with the former Associação Alemã de Esportes (Deutscher SC). The club has 12 international titles.

Alisson Becker is the famous German Brazilian goalkeeper, who plays for Liverpool and Brazil national football team.

Eric Leme Walther Brazil's first Olympic Bobsleigh athlete and founder of the Brazilian Ice Sports Federation (Brasilianischer Eissportverband).

Number of German Brazilians and ethnicity

In the southern states of Santa Catarina and Rio Grande do Sul, Germans were 22.34% and 19.3% respectively of the population in the 1940s and 6.9% for Paraná. Only in the state of Rio Grande do Sul there are approximately between 2.5 million (or even a third of its population) German descent living there.

The percentages are higher in some cities. For example, in the town of Pomerode, Santa Catarina, 90% of the population are Brazilians of German descent, and the main local language is an East Pomeranian dialect. It is considered the most "German" city in Brazil. Many towns in Southern Brazil have a majority of German-descent citizens.

Sometimes, Germans surnames were adapted or changed in Brazil to a more "understandable" writing in Portuguese since many were incomprehensible to Brazilians.

The Lins family

Two of the first Germans that arrived in Brazil were the cousins Sebald Linz von Dorndorf and Christoph Linz (or Sebald Lins von Dorndorf and Christoph Lins) who arrived in Brazil in 1570 as landowners. At the time they arrived, they married into the Luso-Brazilian nobility living there and changed their names to Portuguese names and surnames of Portuguese writing conventions, respectively, Cibaldo Lins and Cristovão Lins, founding the Lins family in Brazil. The surname is original from the surrounding areas around Linz (Austria). The Brazilian family comes from the branch from Ulm (Germany).

The first German communities

Municipalities with co-official German dialects or other Germanic languages

East Pomeranian dialect (Ostpommersch)

Espírito Santo
Domingos Martins
Itarana
Laranja da Terra
Pancas
Santa Maria de Jetibá
Vila Pavão

Minas Gerais
Itueta (only in the district of Vila Nietzel)

Santa Catarina
Pomerode

Rio Grande do Sul
Canguçu (under approval)

Rondônia
Espigão d'Oeste (under approval)

Hunsrik Language (or Riograndenser Hunsrückisch)

Santa Catarina
Antônio Carlos
São João do Oeste
Treze Tílias (language teaching is compulsory in schools, standing on stage in public official of the municipality)

Rio Grande do Sul
Estância Velha
Nova Hartz
Salvador do Sul
Santa Maria do Herval

See also

Brazil–Germany relations
Cândido Godói
Demography of Brazil
German Americans
German Argentines
German Canadians
German colonial projects before 1871
German inventors and discoverers
German Mexicans
Germans in South America
Ratlines (World War II aftermath)

Notes

References

External links
German Oversee Migration in the Online-Databank HISTAT (toll-free, registration necessary, in German)
Instituto Brasileiro de Pesquisa Lingüística – IPOL (Blumenau, Santa Catarina)
Wir Deutschbrasilianer ("We German-Brazilians" (PDF) in German)
Topicos (an Internet magazine published both in German and in Portuguese)

Brazil
European Brazilian
 
German minorities
Brazil–Germany relations